Gignese is a comune (municipality) in the Province of Verbano-Cusio-Ossola in the Italian region Piedmont, located about  northeast of Turin and about  south of Verbania.

The municipality of Gignese contains the frazioni (subdivisions, mainly villages and hamlets) Alpino Cignese, Nocco, and Vezzo.

Gignese borders the following municipalities: Armeno, Brovello-Carpugnino, Omegna, Stresa.

Demographic evolution

References

External links
 www.comune.gignese.vb.it/

Cities and towns in Piedmont